Gabriel Island is a Baffin Island offshore island located in the Arctic Archipelago in the territory of Nunavut. The island lies in Frobisher Bay, south of Hamlen Bay, and southwest of the Hall Peninsula. Islands in the immediate vicinity include Nouyarn Island to the east, McLean Island to the west, and Chase Island to the northwest.

References 

Uninhabited islands of Qikiqtaaluk Region
Islands of Frobisher Bay